George Chinnery (5 January 1774 – 30 May 1852) was an English painter who spent most of his life in Asia, especially India and southern China.

Early life 
Chinnery was born in London, where he studied at the Royal Academy Schools.  His father was an exponent of the Gurney system of shorthand; his elder brother William Chinnery owned what is now Gilwell Park in Epping Forest in Essex, before he was discovered to have committed large-scale fraud, and fled to Sweden.  George Chinnery moved in 1796 to Ireland, where he enjoyed some success as an artist, and married Marianne (née Vigne) on 19 April 1799 in Dublin.

Career 
Chinnery returned to London in 1801 without his wife and two infant children. In 1802 he sailed to Madras (Chennai) on the ship . He established himself as a painter there and then in Calcutta (Kolkata), where he became the leading artist of the British community in India.

By 1813 Chinnery was a freemason, listed as a member of Calcutta's well-to-do masonic lodge Star in the East. This was one of three masonic lodges in that city which took part in the official welcome for Lord Moira (1754-1826), also a freemason, on his arrival there (1813) as the new Governor-General of India. Chinnery's masonic career is otherwise little documented, and its connection with his artistic output unexplored.

Some of his most famous paintings are of the Indian family of Colonel James Achilles Kirkpatrick British Resident to the Nizam of Hyderabad who had set up home, to some scandal among his fellow Europeans, with the Indo-Iranian great niece of the Nizam of Hyderabad's chief minister. He painted The Kirkpatrick Children presenting them " [with a] sympathy that is rare in portraiture of the period; the boy looking straight at the viewer with a self-conscious stance, hand on hip, while the girl looks uncomfortably at the floor." Mounting debt prompted a move in 1825 to southern China.

From 1825 until his death in 1852 Chinnery based himself in Macau, but until 1832 he made regular visits to Canton (now Guangzhou).  He painted portraits of Chinese and Western merchants, visiting sea-captains, and their families resident in Macau.  His work in oil paint was closely imitated by the Cantonese artist Lam Qua, who himself became a renowned portrait painter.  Chinnery also painted landscapes (both in oils and in watercolours), and made numerous drawings of the people of Macau engaged in their daily activities. 

In 1846 he made a six-month visit to Hong Kong, where he suffered from ill health but made detailed studies of the newly founded colony. He died in Macau on 30 May 1852 and is buried in the Old Protestant Cemetery there.

Works 
Apart from  their artistic value, his paintings are historically valuable as he was the only western painter resident in South China between the early and mid 19th century. He vividly depicted the life of ordinary people and the landscape of the Pearl River Delta at that period.  Among the subjects of his portraits are the Scottish opium traders William Jardine and James Matheson as well as the diarist Harriet Low.

George Chinnery learnt the Gurney system shorthand from his father and grandfather (both writing-masters), and he used his own modified  version of this shorthand for jotting quick notes on his pencil sketches.

Legacy 
Substantial collections of Chinnery's drawings are to be found in London in the Victoria and Albert Museum and the British Museum; and in Salem, Mass., at the Peabody Essex Museum. Other notable groups are held in Birmingham Museum and Art Gallery, UK; the Hong Kong Museum of Art; the Macau Museum; and the Macau Museum of Art. The Hongkong and Shanghai Banking Corporation can claim to have the outstanding corporate collection of Chinnery's works. Loan exhibitions of his pictures have been held recently in Centro Cultural de Belém, Lisbon (1995); Metropolitan Teien Art Museum, Tokyo (1996); Hong Kong Museum of History, Hong Kong (2005); and Macau Museum (2010).

Chinnery was the basis for the artist Aristotle Quance in the James Clavell novel Tai-Pan.

Gallery of works

Notes

References 

 Impressions of the East - The Art of George Chinnery, Hong Kong Museum of History, 2005
 Hutcheon, Robin, "Chinnery, the man and the legend," South China Morning Post Ltd, Hong Kong, 1975, with a chapter on Chinnery's shorthand by Geoffrey W. Bonsall.
 Tillotson, Giles, "Fan Kwae pictures: Paintings and drawings by George Chinnery and other artists in the collection of the Hong Kong and Shanghai Banking Corporation", 1987.
 Hutcheon, Robin, "Chinnery", Formasia Ltd, Hong Kong, 1989.
 Conner, Patrick, "George Chinnery 1774-1852, artist of India and the China Coast", ACC, 1989.
 Conner, Patrick, "The Flamboyant Mr Chinnery", catalogue of exhibition held at Asia House, London, 2012.

External Links
 The painting  engraved by William Holl for Fisher's Drawing Room Scrap Book, 1838 with a poetical illustration by Letitia Elizabeth Landon.

Further reading
 

1774 births
1852 deaths
18th-century English painters
English male painters
19th-century English painters
Hong Kong art
Painters from London
Freemasons of the United Grand Lodge of England
19th-century English male artists
18th-century English male artists